"Chocolate" is a song by English rock band the 1975. The song was originally recorded by the band for their third extended play, Music for Cars, where it appears as the second track, and later appeared as the fourth track on their self-titled debut.

The song was featured in a teaser for the 2014 film Love, Rosie.

Content
The narrator sings about fleeing the police in his car with a stash of cannabis, with the term "chocolate" being a euphemism for cannabis.

Lead vocalist and rhythm guitarist Matthew Healy called the song "a love letter to the authority figures in our town — you know about small town boredom, both by the kids and by the police."

The song is recorded in the key of B major with a tempo of 100 beats per minute in common time.  The band's vocals span from B4 to F5.

Music video
A music video to accompany the release of "Chocolate" was first released onto YouTube on 20 February 2013 at a total length of three minutes and forty-seven seconds. It was directed by Gareth Philips.

It is primarily filmed in and around the Limehouse area of London, featuring Canary Wharf, the Limehouse Link and Aspen way landmarks. The group are shown riding around in a vintage 1975 Ford Consul, originally from the British television show The Sweeney.

Charts

Weekly charts

Year-end charts

Certifications

|-

Release history

References

2013 singles
2013 songs
The 1975 songs
Interscope Records singles
Dirty Hit singles
Vagrant Records singles
Songs about cannabis
Songs written by Matthew Healy
Black-and-white music videos